Ular Facula is a bright region on the surface of Mercury, located at 55.1° S, 29.95° W.  It was named by the IAU in 2019.  Ular is the Malay word for snake.

Ular Facula is south of Sarpa Facula and northeast of Pampu Facula.

References

Surface features of Mercury